The Sea Wolf is a lost 1913 American silent adventure film directed by and starring Hobart Bosworth and co-starring Herbert Rawlinson. Based on the 1904 Jack London novel The Sea-Wolf, the production's master negatives were destroyed in the disastrous 1914 vault fire at the Lubin Manufacturing Company, the Philadelphia-based film company that Bosworth contracted to produce theatrical prints of his screen adaptation.

Production history
Bosworth previously made a one reel version of the story at Selig directed by Sidney Ayres. It was never released officially. The Balboa company also made a competing version and was sued by author Jack London who had it removed from theatres. Bosworth formed his own company, hired Jack London himself as a cast member, and made this 7 reel version. It was not released until London's legal dispute with the Balboa company was over. In February 1914 W.W. Hodkinson released the film commercially.

Cast
Hobart Bosworth as Wolf Larsen
Herbert Rawlinson as Humphrey Van Weyden
Viola Barry as Maude Brewster
J. Charles Haydon as Mugridge
Jack London as A Sailor
Gordon Sackville as Johnson
Joe Ray

See also
List of Paramount Pictures films

References

External links

1913 advertisement

1913 films
American silent feature films
Lost American films
Films based on The Sea-Wolf
Sea adventure films
Seafaring films
American black-and-white films
American adventure films
1913 adventure films
1913 lost films
Lost adventure films
1910s American films
Silent adventure films